The Search for the Nile is a 6-part BBC miniseries filmed in Africa and released in 1971. It was narrated by James Mason and won the 1972 primetime Emmy in the docu-drama special achievement category.

The series tells the stories about the expeditions of John Hanning Speke and Richard Francis Burton in order to find the source of the Nile in the 19th century.
Prominent actors were Michael Gough, John Quentin, Ian McCulloch and Kenneth Haigh.

External links
 

1971 British television series debuts
1971 British television series endings
1970s British television miniseries
Adventure films based on actual events
Films set in pre-colonial sub-Saharan Africa